Meganthribus is a genus of beetles belonging to the Anthribidae family.

List of species 
 Meganthribus atopus
 Meganthribus bakeri
 Meganthribus childreni
 Meganthribus confluens
 Meganthribus euspilus
 Meganthribus harmandi
 Meganthribus mindorensis
 Meganthribus nubilus
 Meganthribus papuanus
 Meganthribus pupa
 Meganthribus schanus
 Meganthribus spilosus
 Meganthribus sulphureus
 Meganthribus tessellatus
 Meganthribus whitcheadi
 Meganthribus whiteheadi

References 

 Global Species

Anthribidae
Weevil genera